Mike Tyson Boxing, known in the UK as Prince Naseem Boxing, is a video game developed and published by Codemasters for PlayStation in 2000, and developed by Virtucraft and published by Ubi Soft for Game Boy Advance in 2002.

Reception

The game received "unfavorable" reviews on both platforms according to the review aggregation website Metacritic. Doug Trueman of NextGen said of the PlayStation version, "Although Mike Tyson's reputation would be hard pressed to get any lower, this game manages to do just that." Maxim gave the same console version a negative review, over a week before the game was released Stateside.

Notes

References

External links
 

2000 video games
Boxing video games
Codemasters games
Cultural depictions of Mike Tyson
Game Boy Advance games
PlayStation (console) games
Ubisoft games
Video games based on real people
Video games developed in the United Kingdom